|}

The Lonsdale Cup is a Group 2 flat horse race in Great Britain open to horses aged three years or older. It is run at York over a distance of 2 miles and 56 yards (3,270 metres), and it is scheduled to take place each year in August.

History
The event used to be called the Lonsdale Stakes, and for a period its original distance was 1 mile, 7 furlongs and 198 yards (1.9875 miles or 3198m). It was classed as a Listed race for several years, and it was promoted to Group 3 level in 1998.

The race was renamed the Lonsdale Cup and given Group 2 status in 2004. It was extended by 78 yards in 2007 to its current distance.

The Lonsdale Cup is currently held on the third day of York's four-day Ebor Festival meeting, with the leading horses from the race often going on to compete in the following month's Doncaster Cup.

Records
Most successful horse since 1980 (3 wins):
 Stradivarius - 2018, 2019, 2021

Leading jockey since 1980 (7 wins):
 Frankie Dettori - Sergeant Cecil (2006), Opinion Poll (2010, 2011), Max Dynamite (2015), Stradivarius (2018, 2019, 2021)

Leading trainer since 1980 (5 wins):
 John Dunlop – Angel City (1987), My Patriarch (1994), Celeric (1999), Millenary (2005), Times Up (2012)

Winners since 1980

See also
 Horse racing in Great Britain
 List of British flat horse races

References
 Paris-Turf: 
 Racing Post:
 galopp-sieger.de – Lonsdale Stakes.
 ifhaonline.org – International Federation of Horseracing Authorities – Lonsdale Cup (2019).
 pedigreequery.com – Lonsdale Cup – York.

Flat races in Great Britain
York Racecourse
Open long distance horse races
British Champions Series